Séamus Doyle (1885 – 30 April 1971) was an Irish Sinn Féin politician. He had previously been a brigade adjutant of the Irish Volunteers in the 1916 Easter Rising in Enniscorthy, being was one of the officers who went under military escort to Dublin to receive from Patrick Pearse the order to surrender. After the Rising he was sentenced to death, which later was commuted to a five-year period of imprisonment. He was imprisoned in Ireland and England from his arrest in 1916 to June 1917 when released. He arrested in December 1920, and detained until July 1921 following his election to the Dáil.

He was elected unopposed as a Sinn Féin Teachta Dála (TD) to the 2nd Dáil at the 1921 elections for the Wexford constituency. He opposed the Anglo-Irish Treaty and voted against it. He was elected as an anti-Treaty Sinn Féin TD at the 1922 general election but did not take his seat. He did not contest the 1923 general election.

He served as chairman of Enniscorthy Rural District Council, and was a member of Wexford County Council. Doyle died in Enniscorthy in 1971.

References

External links
 

1885 births
1971 deaths
Early Sinn Féin TDs
Members of the 2nd Dáil
Members of the 3rd Dáil
Politicians from County Wexford
People of the Irish Civil War (Anti-Treaty side)